A dental hygienist or oral hygienist is a licensed dental professional, registered with a dental association or regulatory body within their country of practice. Prior to completing clinical and written board examinations, registered dental hygienists must have either an associate's or bachelor's degree in dental hygiene from an accredited college or university. Once registered, hygienists are primary healthcare professionals who work independently of or alongside dentists and other dental professionals to provide full oral health care. They have the training and education that focus on and specialize in the prevention and treatment of many oral diseases.

Dental hygienists have a specific scope of clinical procedures they provide to their patients. They assess a patient's condition in order to offer patient-specific preventive and educational services to promote and maintain good oral health. A major role of a dental hygienist is to perform periodontal therapy which includes things such periodontal charting, periodontal debridement (scaling and root planing), prophylaxis (preventing disease) or periodontal maintenance procedures for patients with periodontal disease. The use of therapeutic methods assists their patients in controlling oral disease, while providing tailored treatment plans that emphasize the importance of behavioral changes. Some dental hygienists are licensed to administer local anesthesia and perform dental radiography. Dental hygienists are also the primary resource for oral cancer screening and prevention. In addition to these procedures, hygienists may take intraoral radiographs, apply dental sealants, administer topical fluoride, and provide patient-specific oral hygiene instruction.

Dental hygienists work in a range of dental settings, from independent, private, or specialist practices to the public sector. Dental hygienists work together with dentists, dental therapists, oral health therapists, as well as other dental professionals. Dental hygienists aim to work inter-professionally to provide holistic oral health care in the best interest of their patient. Dental hygienists also offer expertise in their field and can provide a dental hygiene diagnosis, which is an integral component of the comprehensive dental diagnosis.

Job description and duties 

In the dental office, the dentist and the dental hygienist work together to meet the oral health needs of patients. Since each country has its own specific regulations regarding their responsibilities, the range of services performed by hygienists varies. Some of the services provided by dental hygienists may include:

 patient screening procedures; such as assessment of oral health conditions, review of the health history, oral cancer screening, head and neck inspection, dental charting and taking blood pressure and pulse
 taking and developing dental radiographs (x-rays)
 removing calculus and plaque (hard and soft deposits) from all surfaces of the teeth
 applying preventive materials to the teeth (e.g., sealants and fluorides)
 teaching patients appropriate oral hygiene strategies to maintain oral health
 counseling patients about good nutrition and its impact on oral health
 making impressions of patients' teeth for study casts (models of teeth used by dentists to evaluate patient treatment needs)
 performing documentation and office management activities

Dental Hygienists Salary 
Jobs for dental are well paid almost on all states of the United States. The median annual wage for dental hygienists was $77,810 in May 2021. 
The median annual wages for dental hygienists in the top industries in which they worked were as follows:

States with the highest employment level in Dental Hygienists:

Top paying states for Dental Hygienists:

Metropolitan areas with the highest employment level in Dental Hygienists:

Top paying metropolitan areas for Dental Hygienists:

Periodontal treatment

Gum disease is caused by a sticky film of bacteria called plaque. Plaque is always forming on teeth, but if it is not cleaned well, the bacteria in plaque can cause gums to become inflamed. When this happens, the gums pull away from the teeth and form spaces called pockets. Plaque then gets trapped in these pockets and cannot be removed with regular brushing. Untreated gum disease can lead to bone and tooth loss. If the periodontal pockets are too deep a deep cleaning (scaling and root planing) is necessary to remove the plaque in these pockets.

Scaling and root planing is a careful cleaning of the root surfaces to remove plaque and calculus from deep periodontal pockets and to smooth the tooth root to remove bacterial toxins. Scaling and root planing is sometimes followed by adjunctive therapy such as local delivery antimicrobials, systemic antibiotics, and host modulation, as needed on a case-by-case basis.

Most periodontists agree that after scaling and root planing, many patients do not require any further active treatment. However, the majority of patients will require ongoing maintenance therapy to sustain health. The maintenance phase involves continuous care, at patient specific levels.

Timeline of dental hygienists
 1906: Alfred Fones trained his chairside assistant (and his cousin), Irene M. Newman, to clean teeth and perform other preventive treatments on children, making her the world's first dental hygienist.
 1913: Alfred Fones began the first school for dental hygienists in Connecticut. 
 1915: Connecticut amended its dental practice act to include the regulation of dental hygienists.
 1917: Irene M. Newman received the world's first license as a dental hygienist in Connecticut in 1917.
 1923: The first meeting of the American Dental Hygienists' Association took place.
 1950: The University of Toronto established the first dental hygiene program in Canada.
 1959: Esther Mae Wilkins, an American dental hygienist and dentist, authored the first comprehensive book on dental hygiene, Clinical Practice of the Dental Hygienist, the first edition of which was published in 1959. 
 1964: The American Dental Hygienists' Association deleted the word "female" from its constitution and bylaws.
 1965: Jack Orio graduated from the University of New Mexico, making him the world's first male dental hygentist.
 1974: Dental hygienists were first trained in New Zealand in 1974, for use in the New Zealand Defence Force. The 1-year course was taught by the Royal New Zealand Dental Corp at the Burnham army base outside Christchurch.  
 1975: The dental hygiene profession was introduced in Australia.
 1993: The New Zealand Dental Hygienists' Association was founded.
 1994: The first independent non-military training for dental hygienists in New Zealand began in 1994.

Training

Australia

Dental hygienists in Australia must be graduates from a dental hygiene program, with either an advanced diploma (TAFE), associate degree, or more commonly a bachelor's degree from a dental hygiene school that is accredited by the Australian Dental Council (ADC) under the Australian Health Practitioner Regulation Agency.

In Australia it is a legal requirement for dental hygienist and oral health therapist graduates to be registered with the Dental Board of Australia before practising their scope in periodontology in any state or territory in Australia.

The Dental Hygienists' Association of Australia (DHAA) Inc., established in 1975, is the peak body representing registered dental hygiene service providers in Australia.
A dental hygienist does not need to be employed by a dentist but can independently assess patients and make treatment plans within their scope of practice whilst working in the community. Practising as an autonomous decision maker, and working within the scope of only what they are "formally" trained in.
The National Law requires the same level of professional responsibility from dental hygienists, oral health therapists and dental therapists as it does from dentists, dental specialists and dental prosthetists in that all practitioners must have their own professional indemnity insurance and radiation licences. They are also required to complete 60 hours of mandatory continuing professional development in a three-year cycle.

A Bachelor of Oral Health is the most common degree program. Students entering a bachelor's degree program are required to have a high school diploma or equivalent. Most Bachelor of Oral Health programs now qualify students as both dental hygienists and dental therapists, collectively known as oral health therapists.

Canada
Dental hygienists in Canada must have completed a diploma program, which can take from 19 months to 3 years to complete. All dental hygiene students must pass a NDHCB examination after graduation. This examination is offered three times per year, January, May and September. Three universities in Canada offer Bachelor of Science degrees in Dental Hygiene:  Dalhousie University, University of Alberta, University of British Columbia.

Dental hygiene across Canada is a well-respected career with many opportunities. These possibilities include working in clinical, administration, education, research and public health positions. The wages vary throughout the country; from approximately $32 per hour in some areas to as high as $55 per hour in others. A surplus of new dental hygiene graduates in recent years has resulted in a decrease in wages in some regions. 

Some of the downfalls to practicing in different provinces are the different regulations. For instance, in BC, the hygienist cannot provide treatment without the patient receiving a dental exam in the previous 365 days unless the practicing hygienist has an extended duty module (resident-care module). In AB, BC, MB and SK, hygienists also administer local anesthesia if qualified to do so.HomeCollege of Dental Hygienists of British Columbia /Saskatchewan Dental Hygienists AssociationHOME In Ontario, dental hygienists may take further training to become a restorative dental hygienist. Registered dental hygienists must register every year by December 31. Ontario dental hygienists must also prove continuing competence by maintaining a professional portfolio yearly. 
In Ontario, dental hygienists are registered with the College of Dental Hygienists of Ontario.   

Dental hygienists in BC, ON, NS and AB are able to open their own private clinics and practice without a dentist on staff.

New Zealand
Dental hygienists are no longer trained in New Zealand. Instead, training has been combined with that of dental therapists to train oral health therapists. Dental hygienists were first domestically trained in 1974 for use in the New Zealand Defence Force. The 1-year course was taught by the Royal New Zealand Dental Corp at the Burnham army base outside Christchurch. Hygiene training was briefly offered at the Wellington School for Dental Nurses in 1990 as 2-week a supplement to Dental Therapy students training. However, this was quickly discontinued.

The first independent non-military training began in 1994. Otago Polytechnic began offering a 15-month Certificate in Dental Hygiene in Dunedin. In 1998, the programme was modified to be a 2-year Diploma. Otago Polytech stopped offering the course in 2000. The following year, University of Otago began offering a 2-year Diploma in Dental Hygiene qualification. In 2002, the university added a 3-year Bachelor of Health Sciences (endorsed in Dental Hygiene) degree alongside the Diploma.

From 2006, New Zealand dental hygienists and now oral health therapists have been trained at either University of Otago in Dunedin (at the country's only Dental School) or at Auckland University of Technology. Until official establishment of the oral health therapy scope in late 2017, the qualifications (Bachelor of Oral Health at Otago, Bachelor of Health Science (Oral Health) at AUT) enabled graduates to register and practise as both a dental hygienist and a dental therapist.

In order to practise, dental hygienists and oral health therapists must register and annually recertify with the Dental Council of New Zealand. One dental hygienist is represented on Council for a 3-year term.

The representing body for dental hygienists was the New Zealand Dental Hygienists' Association. The association was founded in 1993, and is affiliated with the International Federation of Dental Hygienists. In 2021 the association merged with the New Zealand Dental and Oral Health Therapists Association to become the New Zealand Oral Health Association.

United States

Dental hygienists in the United States must be graduates from a dental hygiene program, with either an associate degree (most common), a certificate, a bachelor's degree or a master's degree from a dental hygienist school that is accredited by the American Dental Association (ADA).

All dental hygienists in the United States must be licensed by the state in which they practice, after completing a minimum of two years of school and passing a written board known as the National Board Dental Hygiene Examination as well as a clinical board exam. After completing these exams and licenses, dental hygienists may use "R.D.H" after their names to signify that they are a registered dental hygienist. Dental hygienists also have to become licensed in the state in which they intend to practice. State licensure requirements vary, however most states require an associate degree in Dental Hygiene, successful completion of a state licensure examination, as well as a clinical examination also typically administered by the state.

Dental hygienists school programs usually require both general education courses and courses specific to the field of dental hygiene. General education courses important to dental hygiene degrees include college level algebra, biology, and chemistry. Courses specific to dental hygiene may include anatomy, oral anatomy, materials science, pharmacology, radiography, periodontology, nutrition, and clinical skills. 

A Bachelor of Science in Dental Hygiene is typically a four-year program. Students entering a bachelor's degree program are required to have a high school diploma or equivalent, but many dental hygienists with an associate degree or certification enter the bachelor's degree programs to expand their clinical expertise and help advance their careers. 

Graduate degrees in the field of dental hygiene are typically two-year programs and are completed after the bachelor's degree. Common graduate courses in dental hygiene include Healthcare Management, Lab Instruction, and Clinical Instruction.

In addition, the American Dental Hygienists' Association has defined a more advanced level of dental hygiene, the Advanced Dental Hygiene Practitioner otherwise known as a dental therapist.

Dental hygienist students perform practical oral examinations free of charge at some institutions which have expressed a shortage in recent years.

Direct access to care with a dental hygienist
The dental hygienists in some parts of North America can provide oral hygiene treatment based on the assessment of a patient's needs without the authorization of a dentist, treat the patient in absence of a dentist, and also maintain a provider-patient relationship.

India
The Dental Hygienist Course in India is a full-time 2-year diploma course. The Dental Hygienist course is regulated and controlled by the Dental Council of India. After completion of the course a dental hygienist should register with a state dental council.  Any person who is a registered dental hygienist in a one state may practice as such in any other.  The Federation of Indian Dental Hygienists Association is the primary national body representing the dental hygienist profession in India, however some state dental hygienist associations also work at state level.  In India, dental hygienists do not need to be employed by a dentist but can have their own clinic.

Canada

British Columbia
1995 - A client must have seen a dentist within the previous 365 days in order for the hygienist to provide dental hygiene treatment.

2012  - New bylaws offers an exemption from the 365-day rule if hygienists are registered in the Full Registration (365 Day Rule Exempt) class.

Alberta
2006 - Dental hygienists are able to offer their services in many practice settings including independent practice.

Manitoba
2008 - If the dental hygienist has practiced for more than 3000 hours, and the client does not have a complex medical condition then the hygienists do not require the supervision of a dentist.

Ontario
2007 - Registered dental hygienists in Ontario who have been approved by the College of Dental Hygienists of Ontario can practice independently.

United States

California
1998 - Registered dental hygienist in alternative practice (RDHAP): RDHAPs may provide services for homebound persons or at residential facilities, schools, institutions and in dental health professional shortage areas without the supervision of a dentist. RDHAPs can provide patient care for up to 18 months and longer if the patient obtains a prescription for additional oral treatment from a dentist or physician .

Colorado
1987 - Unsupervised practice: Hygienists may have their own dental hygiene practice; there are no requirement for the authorization or supervision of a dentist for most services. Colorado is currently the only state where this is approved. Case was won by JoAnn Grant, a dental hygienist from Fort Collins, CO.

Connecticut
1999 - Public health dental hygienist: dental hygienists may practice without supervision in institutions, public health facilities, group homes, and schools as long as they have two years of work experience.

Maine
2008 - Independent practice dental hygienist: A dental hygienist licensed with an independent practice may work without the supervision of a dentist, providing that the dental hygienist has to complete 2,000 work hours of clinical practice during the two years prior to applying for an independent license, as well as a bachelor's degree from a CODA accredited dental hygiene program or complete 6,000 work hours of clinical practice during the six years prior to applying for an independent license, as well as an associate degree from a CODA accredited dental hygiene program.

Michigan
2005 - PA 161 Dental hygienist: hygienists with grantee status can work in a public or nonprofit environment, a school or nursing home that administers dental care to a low-income population. Dentists collaborating with dental hygienists do not need to be present to authorize or administer treatment. However, dental hygienists must have the availability to communicate with a dentist in order to review patient records and establish emergency protocols. Hygienists need to apply to the state department of community health for grantee status.

Washington
1984 - Unsupervised practice: dental hygienist practice without the supervision of a dentist is allowed in hospitals, group homes, nursing homes, home health agencies, Health and Human Service state institutions, jails, and public health facilities as long as the hygienist refers their patients to a dentist for treatment. Hygienists must have at least two years of work experience within the last 5 years.

Notable dental hygienists

Janet Gardner
Esther Wilkins

See also

 Dentist
 Dental therapist
 Dental nurse
 Dental assistant
 Periodontal disease
 Gingivitis
 Periodontitis

Further reading
 Mueller-Joseph, L., & Petersen, M. (1995). Dental Hygiene Process: Diagnosis and Care Planning. Albany, NY: Delmar.
 Dental Hygienists' Association of Australia Inc. (2014). "What is a Dental Hygienist?" Retrieved from Information Brochure - DHAA: Dental Hygienists' Association of Australia Inc. Supporting uniformity of Practice & growth of the dental hygienist profession

References

External links 
 Important Facts About Dental Hygienists  on American Dental Hygienists' Association

Dentistry occupations

pl:Dentysta